Eric Allen (born 1965) is an American football cornerback.

Eric Allen may also refer to:
Eric Allen (wide receiver) (1949–2015), former Michigan State running back and CFL wide receiver
Eric Allen (musician), musician 
Éric J. Allen, Canadian astronomer